Jean-Stéphane Sauvaire (born 31 December 1968), is a French filmmaker, producer and screenwriter. He is best known as the director of films Johnny Mad Dog, A Prayer Before Dawn and La Mule.

Personal life
Sauvaire was born on 31 December 1968 in Paris, France. He currently lives in New York City.

Career
In 1991, he started film career as a first assistant director of the film Les Nuits Fauves by Cyril Collard. Then he joined the crew for the films Les Demons de Jesus and Les Grandes Bouches directed by Bernie Bonvoisin, I Stand Alone by Gaspar Noé, Sous Les Pieds Des Femmes directed by Rachida Krim, Hors Jeu by Karim Dridi, Louise (Take 2) by Siegfried and Love Me by Laetitia Masson. He continued to work as the assistant director until 2000. At the end of 2000, he directed his three short films, La Mule (co-directed with Rossy De Palma), A Dios and Matalo. In all these three short films, he used the theme of violence among adolescents.

In 2008, he made the film Johnny Mad Dog co-produced with Mathieu Kassovitz. The film was later presented in the Official Selection, 'Un Certain Regard' section at the Cannes Film Festival and won the Prize for Hope. The film was an adaptation of the novel 'Johnny Chien Méchant' written by Congolese writer Emmanuel Dongala. It tells the story of a group of child soldiers fighting for the Liberians United for Reconciliation and Democracy (LURD) rebels in 2003, during the latter part of the Second Liberian Civil War.

After the success of the film, he directed a telefilm Punk in 2012, which was co-produced by Arte, with Paul Bartel and Béatrice Dalle. In 2017, he made the film A Prayer Before Dawn which was adapted from the story of Billy Moore. The film received an official selection at the 70th Cannes Film Festival in 2017.

Filmography

References

External links
 
 ‘A Prayer Before Dawn’ Director Jean-Stéphane Sauvaire Boards WWII Survival Story ‘Jungle Soldier’

1968 births
Living people
21st-century French male writers
21st-century French screenwriters
Cinematographers from Paris
Film directors from Paris
French cinematographers
French film directors
French male screenwriters
Writers from Paris